You Are The One (½缘分) is a 25 episode Singaporean Chinese drama series aired on MediaCorp TV Channel 8. The show stars Hong Kong actress Adia Chan, Chew Chor Meng, Jacelyn Tay, Christopher Lee, Rui En, Terence Cao and Richard Low.

Plot 
The drama is about 3 daughters and their father. Hao Meili is the second sister and the ugliest and wishes to find a boyfriend, Yukiko Hao Meide is the youngest and is the prettiest. She has plenty of suitors but won't settle down. Hao Meiman is the eldest. She is a career-minded woman and has an arch rival, Raymond See. In the end, Hao Meiman married Raymond See and was pregnant when Hao Meili married Simon See and Hao Meide married An Zhengxi.

Cast 

 Adia Chan as Hao Meiman
 Jacelyn Tay as Hao Meili
 Rui En as Yukiko Hao Meide
 Richard Low as Hao Shunli
 Chew Chor Meng as Raymond See
 Christopher Lee as Simon See
 Terence Cao as An Zhengxi

Accolades

References

External links
Theme song

Singapore Chinese dramas
2005 Singaporean television series debuts
2005 Singaporean television series endings
Channel 8 (Singapore) original programming